Magdalena Kiszczyńska (born 14 April 1988) is a former tennis player from Poland.

As a professional, her career-high singles ranking is world No. 293, achieved on 8 October 2007, in doubles 147 (27 July 2009). She won three ITF titles in singles and 18 ITF doubles titles.

ITF Circuit finals

Singles: 7 (3–4)

Doubles: 28 (18–10)

External links
 
 

1988 births
Living people
Sportspeople from Szczecin
Polish female tennis players
20th-century Polish women
21st-century Polish women